This list of botanical gardens and arboretums in Washington is intended to include all significant botanical gardens and arboretums in the U.S. state of Washington.

See also
List of botanical gardens and arboretums in the United States

References 

 
 
Tourist attractions in Washington (state)
botanical gardens and arboretums in Washington (state)